The Iranian Volleyball Super League 2015–16 was the 29th season of the Iranian Volleyball Super League, the highest professional volleyball league in Iran.

Regular season

Standings

Gohar Kavir Zahedan withdrew during the regular season due to financial problems. All results were declared null and void.

Results

Playoffs
All times are Iran Standard Time (UTC+03:30).
All series were the best-of-three format.

Quarterfinals
Sarmayeh Bank Tehran vs. Arman Ardakan

Samen Al-hojaj Khorasan vs. Shahrdari Tabriz

Paykan Tehran vs. Matin Varamin

Shahrdari Urmia vs. Saipa Tehran

Semifinals
Sarmayeh Bank Tehran vs. Samen Al-hojaj Khorasan

Paykan Tehran vs. Shahrdari Urmia

3rd place
Samen Al-hojaj Khorasan vs. Shahrdari Urmia

Shahrdari Urmia and Samen Al-hojaj Khorasan shared the 3rd place.

Final
Sarmayeh Bank Tehran vs. Paykan Tehran

Final standings

Notable foreign players
 Łukasz Żygadło (Sarmayeh Bank Tehran)
 Valerio Vermiglio (Paykan Tehran)
 Nikolay Nikolov (Paykan Tehran)
 Vojin Ćaćić (Samen Al-hojaj Khorasan)
 Valentin Bratoev (Shahrdari Tabriz)
 Nico Freriks (Kalleh Mazandaran)

References

External links
Iran Volleyball Federation

League 2015-16
Iran Super League, 2015-16
Iran Super League, 2015-16
Volleyball League, 2015-16
Volleyball League, 2015-16